Space and Sport Games is a 1980 collection of video games published by Creative Computing.

Contents
Space and Sport Games is a collection of nine games, three of which have to do with space.

Reception
Bruce F. Webster reviewed Space and Sport Games in The Space Gamer No. 35. Webster commented that "There are nine games in all on this diskette, all of the same quality. I suspect all nine were placed there because the folks at Creative Computing couldn't justify selling them in smaller groups. I'm not sure they can justify selling them in this large group. Don't buy it."

References

1980 video games
Science fiction video games
Sports video games
Video games developed in the United States